Pabna District is a district in central Bangladesh. It is an economically important district. Its administrative capital is the eponymous Pabna town.

History

Archeologist Cunningham conjectured that the name "Pabna" might be derived from the Pundra or Poondrobordhon civilisation, whose capital was Mahasthangarh, the oldest city of Bangladesh, in neighbouring Bogra, but this hypothesis has not received general acceptance among scholars.

In 1859–61, the district was one of the major areas involved in the Indigo revolt. Beginning in Yusufshahi period in 1873, the serfs resisted excessive demands of increased rents by feudal lords (zamindar), They were led by the nouveau riches Banerjees and Dwijendranath Tagore, by forming an Agrarian League. This largely peaceful movement found the support of the Lieutenant-governor of Bengal, George Campbell, who antagonised the absentee feudal lords. These protests are generally referred to as Pabna disturbances. In the following year, the district was one of the worst hit by famine. The peasants' demands were finally partially met with the Rent Law Act of 1885.

In 1875, Raaygonj was transferred back to Pabna from Bogra, and in 1879, a separate judgeship for the districts of Pabna and Bogra was created.

Geography

Pabna forms the south-east boundary of Rajshahi Division. Sirajganj District is on the north-east, while the Padma River, the main stream of the holy river Ganges, in the south separates it from Rajbari District and Kushtia District. The Jamuna River runs along its eastern border separating it from Manikgonj District; and on the north-west, it has a common boundary with the Natore District. Its average maximum temperature is 36.8 °C, and the minimum is 9.6 °C; annual rainfall is 1872 mm. Characteristically, the soil of the district is divided into four, due to the flood plains of the Ganges, Karatoya, Jamuna, and Barind Tracts. Its main rivers are the Ganges, Ichamati, Gumani, Baral, and Hurasagar Rivers.
The rivers Padma and Jamuna meet at the south-eastern end of Pabna Aminpur Thana.

Rivers 

The district is intersected by rivers of varying magnitude. The river system, though, is constituted by the Padma and the Jamuna with their interlacing offshoots and tributaries. Besides these flowing streams, the interior has the abandoned beds of old rivers, most of which are dry except in the rains.The general trend of the drainage of the Serajganj subdivision is from north-west to south-east, with the rivers entering it from the north-west flow into the Jamuna after a tortuous course. In the Sadar subdivision, however, the general slope of the country is from west to east, and the main rivers fall into Hurasagar, an offshoot of the Jamuna.

The following rivers flow through Pabna District:
 Padma River
 Ichhamati River
 Baral River
 Atrai River
 Chiknai River
 Jamuna River
 Kazipur River
 Karatoya River
 Hurasgar River
 Gumany River
 Rotnai River
 Badai River
 Kageshari River
 Sutikhali River
 Komla River
 Chondraboti River

Climate

Demographics

According to the 2011 Bangladesh census, Pabna district had a population was 2,523,179, of which 1,262,934 were males and 1,260,245 females. Rural population was 2,135,504 (84.64%) while the urban population was 387,675 (15.36%). Pabna district had a literacy rate of 46.72% for the population 7 years and above: 47.83% for males and 45.61% for females.

Muslims are the overwhelming majority. The Hindu population has continuously decreased from 1981, when it was a high of 100,000.

Economy 

Pabna's economy is quite prosperous. Lots of small and big industries and industries have developed here. Besides, there is a BSIC industrial city in Pabna where there are a large number of industrial factories.
 Main occupations: Agriculture 34%, agricultural farm-hands 22.77%, wage labourer 4.46%, transport 2.18%, weavers 2.85%, commerce 13.27%, service 7.26%, and others 13.21%
 Land control: Among the peasants, 29% are landless peasants, with 49% small, 18% intermediate, and 4% rich
 Value of land: The market value of the land of the first grade is Tk 15500 per 0.01 acre
 Crops: Paddy rice, jute, wheat, sugarcane, oil seeds, onion, garlic, betel leaf (paan), pulses
 Fruits: Mango, jackfruit, banana, lychee (lichu), coconut, guava, pomelo, and papaya
 Fisheries, dairies, and poultries: 1069 dairies, 88 fisheries, 714 poultry, and 37 hatcheries
 Industries: Ishwardi EPZ; Pakshey paper mill, sugar mill, cotton mill, jute press, edible oil mill, Square Pharmaceuticals, biscuit factory. The most prominent rice industry is Purbasha Automatic Rice Mills Ltd. in Ishwardi and flour mill (Rouf and Sons Flour Mill), ice factory, welding, saw mill, and cold storage. The SQUARE group established several factories in the district, namely pharmaceuticals, spices, food, toiletries, and textiles, and converted the agricultural economy of Pabna to an industrial society
 Cottage industries: Hand loom, bamboo and caneworks, blacksmith, goldsmith, potteries, woodworks, and tailoring
 Main exports: Rice, jute, betel leaf, hosiery goods, cotton, cotton fabrics
 Active NGOs: BRAC, CARE, ASA, Grameen Bank, Caritas, Proshika, Shomota, Thengamaara Mohila Shobuj Shongho (TMSS), Polli Progoti, ASEAB, BOSS

Irrigation

Water from the river Jamuna is pumped from Bera pump house to the east through the Baral river.

Points of interest

Pakshey is a popular green area and a small town. The railway colony of Paksey, divisional headquarters of Bangladesh Railway, has many old trees and is beside the river Padma and the Hardinge Bridge. An export processing zone (EPZ) and the newly built Lalon Shah Bridge are situated here.

Idyllic Poddar Par (the bank of the Padma) at Shilaaidoho Ghaat is 5 km south of town's old Technical Institute, where people can enjoy a river cruise. A river crossing (ghaat) here connects to Shilaaidoho of Kumarkhali Upazila of Kushtia District. Nobel laureate poet Rabindranath Tagore had a Koothibari (villa) at Shilaaidoho, where his birth anniversary is celebrated regularly.

Bangladesh Mental Hospital, Pabna is a hospital beside Pabna's main town, and the only mental hospital in Bangladesh. Mental patients from anywhere in Bangladesh go there to get treatment.

There is a marshy area, Chalan Beel, in the north.

Dhalarchar (Aminpur) was famous for crime, but it is now popular and valuable for its geographical position after established Aminpur Thana.

Administration
The district comprises nine upazilas:
 Atgharia Upazila
 Bera Upazila
 Bhangura Upazila
 Chatmohar Upazila
 Faridpur Upazila (formerly Banwari Nagar)
 Ishwardi Upazila
 Pabna Sadar Upazila
 Santhia Upazila
 Sujanagar Upazila
 Zila Parishad chairman: Rezaur Rahim Laal
 Deputy Commissioner (DC): MD Jasim Uddin
 City Mayor : Sharif Uddin Prodhan

Health

A general hospital and a mental hospital are in Pabna. The 11 thanas of the district hold a Upazila health complex each. Each Upazila health complex has qualified doctors who got appointment through Bangladesh Civil Service (BCS) commission. For better treatment, people need to go to medical college and other tertiary hospitals in Rajshahi or Dhaka. The 250-bed government general hospital is here, with a 450-bed mental hospital, second oldest in Indian subcontinent, only after Ranchi Mental Hospital, Jharkhand, India. Recently, government-owned Pabna Medical College and Hospital has been set up. Around 15 health clinics are available in Pabna.

Mental Hospital, Pabna and Pabna Medical College and Hospital are built on land donated by Lord Thakur Anukulchandra at Hemayetpur.

Centre for the Rehabilitation of the Paralysed has started its 10th subcenter at Pabna in the name of “CRP- Pabna Diabetic Shamity” from January 2017 with the collaboration of Pabna Diabetic Shamity to provide rehabilitation services such as physiotherapy, occupational therapy, speech and language therapy, awareness raising program regarding disability and rehabilitation, and scarf-injury prevention, and also provide assistive devices to the persons with disabilities.

Transport

Roads, waterways, railways, and one airport are present. The traditional  (sedans), tomtom (horse carriages), and gorur gaari (bullock carts) are now going out of the fashion. Inexpensive Chinese electric and petrol autobikes (tricycles) are gaining popularity as urban transport. Dhaka is about five hours by road. Hardinge Bridge and Lalon Shah Bridge over the Padma linked Pabna with Kushtia District and Khulna Division and the southern Bangladesh. Before the Partition of India, it was a major stoppage for trains from Kolkata to Assam and Darjeeling. Pabna is also connected to Dhaka by the age old roadway through the Jamuna River crossing at Nogorbari, opposite to the river crossing of Aricha at Manikgonj District. It is also very well connected with Dhaka by modern roads through Jamuna Bridge. There is a new rail link established in Pabna town.

Pabna Railway Station is situated in near Pabna Central Bus Terminal. Nearby rail stations are situated in Tebunia, Chatmohar Upazila and Ishwardi Upazila. Ishwardi Upazila is one of the important railway junctions of the North Bengal as well as in Bangladesh. There are nine rail stations in this district: Ishwardi,  Pakshi, Muladuli, Chatmohar, Bhangura, Baral Bridge, Sharat Nagar, Dilpashar and Guakhara. Pabna is well connected by road, rail, river or air to the rest of the country.

Ishwardi Upazila has an airport. Biman Bangladesh Airlines used to operate twice-weekly services to Ishwardi from Hazrat Shahjalal International Airport, Dhaka, but no airline is operating to and from Ishwardi now.

Several Dhaka-bound private bus services are available: Pabna Express, Shyamoli Parbahan, Sarkar Travels, Raja Badshah, Ishurdi Express, Shahzadpur Travels, Baadol, Night Star, Kings, Esha, Mahanagar, Capital Service, Sakal Shandha, Uttara, B Nagar, Al Hamra, etc. The government-owned Bangladesh Road Transport Corporation (BRTC) provides bus services to Rajshahi and Bogra cities. Water transport is important, as the Padma and other rivers and Chalan Beel are situated in Pabna.

Education

Overall, literacy for males is 71.8% and for females 65.7%. A renowned science and technology university, Pabna University of Science and Technology, is located there, as are 34 colleges, a cadet college, a law college, a government polytechnic institute, a government vocational training institute, a textiles college, a government commerce college, a teachers' training college, a primary teacher's training institute, a nursing training institute, a homoeopathic college, 202 high schools, 29 junior high schools, a Madrassa Aliya, 261  madrassa (seminary), 667 government primary schools, 445 nongovernment primary schools, eight community schools, 29 kindergartens, 32 satellite schools, 299 NGO-operated schools, and a music college. Pabna Zilla School, Pabna Edward College, and Banwarinagar C.B. Pilot High School of this district are very old in the region–over a hundred years.

Noted educational institutions are:

School
 Pabna Cadet College (1981)
 Pabna Zilla School (1853)
 Pabna Govt. Girls High School (1883)
 Govt. Edward College, Pabna (founded 1898)
 Pabna University of Science and Technology (2008)
 Pabna Medical College (2008)
 Pabna Textile Engineering College (2008)
 Pabna Polytechnic Institute (1962)
 Govt Technical School and College, Pabna (1889)
 Selim Nazir High School (1924)
 Pabna Collectorate Public School and College (2008)
 North Bengal Paper Mills High School, Paksey (1972)
 R.M Academy School & College, Pabna
 Jagir Hossain Academy, Pabna (1983)
 Al-hera Academy School and College (1987)
 Gopal Chandra Institution (GCI) (1894)
 Galaxy School & College Bera-Pabna (2001)
 Atghoreia Government College (1972)
 Atghoria Government High School (1954)
 Government Shahid Bulbul College
 Pabna City College
 Banwarinagar Cornation Bonomali Pilot High School (1912), Faridpur
 Basanta Raha Institute of engineering and health science (1899)
 Shahid Fazlul Haque Municipal High School (1967)
 Banglamotion Institute of Engineering & Technology (2012)
 Pabna Town Girls High School (1903)
 Madrassa Aliya (1925)
 MC Jubilee High School (1936)
 Pabna Cadet Collegiate School (1993)
 Online.net (IT School) (2000)
 Amina Monsoor Girls High School (2002)
 Ataikula High School (1938)
 Bhangura Union High School
 Bhangura Jarina Rahim Girls High School
 Haji Jamal Uddin Degree College
 Bhangura Alia Madrassa
 Hadol Madrassa, Debottor, Atgharia, Pabna
 Government Primary School (1880)
 Varenga (Bera) Academy (1835)
 Bera B B High School (1899)
 Adarsha High School, Kaitola (1972)
 Bera High School (1906)
 Monjur Kadir Mohila College, Bera, Pabna (1990)
 Dhobakhola Coronation High School (1906)
 Banwarinagar Pilot Girls High School (1972), Faridpur
 Shara (Ishwardi) Marwari School (1917)
 Khalilpur (Shujanogor) High School (1901)
 Bhadurpur Government Primary School (1909)
 JotGoury Jalalpur Government Primary School (1943)
 Dulai High School (1967)
 Pabna Collectorate Public School and College (2009)
 Khan Pura High School (1918)
 Malifa Habibor Rahman Multilateral High School (1957)
 Masundia Bhabanipur K.J.B College
 Masundia Bhabanipur High School
 Pabna College, Pabna (1983)
 Nariagodai High School, Nariagodai, Santhia, Pabna (1963)
 Kashinathpur Abdul Latif High School, Pabna
 Sujanager Pilot Model High School And College (1956)
 Karanja Pre Cadet School & College (2005)
 Pakuria School and College (1907)
 Imam Hossain Academy, Santhia, Pabna (2001)
 Santhia Pilot High School, Santhia (1943)
 Chatmohar RCN & BSN High School & College (1861)
 Saint Rts. High School, Mothurapur, Chatmohar, Pabna (1970)
 Chiknai High School, Mulgram, Chatmahor
 Chatmohar Pilot Girls High School (1970)
 Chatmohar Government Degree (hons) College (1970)
 Tebunia Wasim Pathshala, Tebunia, Pabna
 Samsul Huda Degree College, Tebunia, Pabna
 Shaheed Abdul Khaleque High School, Khidirpur, Atgharia, Pabna
 Par Khidirpur High School, Atgharia, Pabna
 Ramchandrapur High School, Atgharia, Pabna
 Khidirpur College, Atgharia, Pabna
 Par Khidirpur College, Atgharia, Pabna

Newspapers 
Locally published newspapers and periodicals include:
 Newspabna.com
 Doinik Ichhamoti
 Doinik Shatakantha
 Doinik Pabna Protidin
 Doinik Uttor Jonota (Ishwardi)
 Gan Bikashini
 Pabna Barta
 Bibriti
 Banshpatra
 Pabnar alo
 Arshi
 Jamuna
 Charmohar Barta
 Faridpur Barta
 Junction
 Jonodabi (Ishwardi)
 Gan Prova
 Polli Dorpon
 Manoshi
 Amar Desh and Pabna
 Tawhid (Bhangura)
 Chetona
 Shocheton
Dainik abc Barta(Aminpur)

National dailies like Prothom Alo, The Daily Star, Jugantor, Ittefaq, Kaaler Kontho, Janakantha, Amader Shomoy, The New Age are also available.

Members of ninth Jatiyo Sangshad (2009–)
 Pabna-1 (Santhia Upazila and part of Bera Upazila) Seat 68: Mohammad Shamsul Haque (Tuku) [from Awami League].
 Pabna-2 (Sujanagar Upazila and part of Bera Upazila) Seat 69: Ahmed Firoz Kabir [from Awami League]
 Pabna-3 (Chatmohar Upazila, Bhangura Upazila and Faridpur Upazila) Seat 70: Mohammad Mokbul Hossain [from Awami League]
 Pabna-4 (Ishwardi Upazila and Atgharia Upazila) Seat 71: Nuruzzaman Biswas [from Awami League]
 Pabna-5 (Pabna Sadar Upazila) Seat 72: Khondokar Golam Faruk (Prince) [from Awami League]

Notable residents 

 Thakur Anukulchandra, guru, physician and founder of Satsang Ashram
 Group Captain (Rtd.) Saiful Azam, former pilot of Bangladesh Air Force, Pakistan Air Force, Jordanian Air Force and Iraqi Air Force. He was a war hero of 1965 Indo-Pakistani War and 1967 Arab-Israeli War (Six-Day War).
 Selina Banu, politician
 General Joyanto Nath Chaudhuri OBE, former Chief of Army Staff of the Indian Army
 Pramatha Chaudhuri, writer
 Samson H. Chowdhury, former chairman of Square Group
 Priyamvada Devi, writer
 Amzad Hossain, MNA (Member of National Assembly of Pakistan), organizer of Liberation War 
 A. B. Mirza Azizul Islam, advisor of Bangladesh Caretaker Government 2007-2008
 Air Vice Marshal (Rtd.) A. K. Khandker, first Chief of Staff of Bangladesh Air Force (1971–1975), and former Planning Minister
 Mozid Mahmud, poet and essayist, recognized as a major poet of the 1980s, with more than thirty books to his credit
 Amiya Bhushan Majumdar, Indian novelist
 Bonde Ali Miah, poet
 Motiur Rahman Nizami, Ameer (chairman) of Jamaat-e-Islami Bangladesh, former Member of Jatiyo Sangshad (2001–2006), former Minister of Agriculture (2001–2003), and executed under trial for war crimes during the Liberation War of Bangladesh in 1971
 Shreemati Rasasundari, 19th century writer
 Dilip Bagchi, Bengali mass singer and political activist

Notes

References

External links

 
 pabna24.com
 newspabna.com
 Onabil Songbad

 
Districts of Bangladesh
Districts of Bangladesh established before 1971